Titanis is an extinct genus of giant flightless phorusrhacid bird (also known as terror birds) that inhabited North America during the early Pliocene to early Pleistocene epochs. The generic name, Titanis, refers to the titans, Ancient Greek gods that preceded the Twelve Olympians, in allusion to the bird's size. The specific name, T. walleri, honors the holotype's collector, Benjamin I. Waller, an avocational underwater archaeologist. Titanis was thought to be carnivorous and most likely preyed on the many small mammals of the time period. This giant flightless bird was one of the most efficient predators of its time in North America.

Description 
 
When compared with other phorusrhacids, the examined material indicates a large variation in the size of Titanis, perhaps indicating strong sexual dimorphism. It had long, agile legs, and three-toed feet with long talons. It could undoubtedly run at high speeds when hunting. Though its skull has not been found, it most probably would have been large, with a huge, axe-like beak, like its relatives.

Overall, Titanis was very similar to the South American Phorusrhacos and Devincenzia, its closest relatives. However, it differs from these in having a shorter, thicker neck, and an overall more heavily built bodily structure. Little is known of its body structure, but it seems to have been less wide-footed than Devincenzia, with a proportionally much stronger middle toe.

Wings 
The wings were small and could not have been used for flight. The wing bones articulated in an unusual joint-like structure, suggesting the digits could flex to some degree. It also had a relatively rigid wrist, which would not have allowed the hand to fold back against the arm to the same degree as other birds. This led R. M. Chandler to suggest that the wings may have supported some type of clawed, mobile hand similar to the hands of non-avian theropod dinosaurs, such as the dromaeosaurs (also popularly known as "raptors").

However, it was later pointed out that this wing joint is not in fact unique, and is present in seriemas (extant members of the same order, Cariamae, to which Titanis and other phorusrhacids belonged), which do not have any specialized grasping hands.

Discovery 

The first described fossils of Titanis were collected in 1961 by Benjamin Waller in a site dating to the Blancan in the Santa Fe River on the county borderland between Gilchrist and Columbia Counties in Florida, the first Phorusrhacid fossils found in North America. The fossils were fragmentary and from several different individuals, including the distal end of a tarsometatarus (UF-4108) that was associated with a phalanx 1 of digit 3 from the foot. It lived approximately 5 to 2 million years ago (early Pliocene to early Pleistocene) in North America. Fossil evidence has been found in three locations in Florida and one in Texas. The Gilchrist County, Florida site dates from 3.0 to 2.9 million years ago. The Santa Fe River, where 27 of the 41 Titanis fossil specimen have been found, is located in Gilchrist County. The other locations that Titanis has been found include Port Charlotte and Inglis, Florida. Only one specimen has been found outside of Florida, and that was in the Nueces River in Texas.

Classification 
Titanis was part of the group of giant flightless birds called the Phorusrhacidae, which are nicknamed "terror birds". It was thought to represent the youngest species of the lineage but recently, a significantly younger South American example has been reported. The Phorusrhacidae originated in South America; Titanis is the only known member of the branch of the group that migrated out of that continent during the Great American Interchange.

A lineage of related predatory birds, the bathornithids, occurred in North America from the Paleocene to the Miocene. They were not ancestral to Titanis or any other phorusrhacid, but they occupied similar ecological niches and some like Paracrax even attained similar sizes, reaching above 2 meters in height. They became extinct more or less 15 million years before Titanis reached North America.  The only living relatives of Titanis are the seriemas.

Paleobiology 
Studies of the closely related Andalgalornis steulleti, which is also in the family Phorusrhacidae reveals new information about the head and neck movement of T. walleri and all "terror birds" of this family. In a series of tests on the skull of Andalgalornis, it was found that these birds would have had a hard time moving their heads laterally. However, the back and forth movement of the skull was tremendous, and it is thought that Titanis most likely used its massive skull to pummel prey to death.

Extinction 
The extinction of T. walleri and other phorusrhacids throughout the Americas may have resulted from competition with large placental (canid, felid, and possibly ursid) carnivores that radiated in the same ancient terrestrial ecosystems during the Great American Interchange. However, this has been contested as Titanis walleri had competed successfully against both groups for several million years upon entering North America.

From circumstantial evidence (i.e., bone fractures), it has been suggested that the species did not become extinct until 15,000 years ago, but more precise dating by McFadden and colleagues refutes such a late date; all known Titanis fossils appear to be at least 2 million years old.

References

External links 

 dinosoria.com: Titanis walleri reconstructions. Retrieved 2007-FEB-09.

 Discover Magazine, June 1997: Terror Take Two 

Extinct flightless birds
Bird genera
Phorusrhacinae
Pleistocene genus extinctions
Pliocene birds of North America
Pleistocene birds of North America
Fossil taxa described in 1963
Taxa named by Pierce Brodkorb